Malcolm Cecil (9 January 193728 March 2021) was a British jazz bassist, record producer, engineer and electronic musician. He was a founding member of a leading UK jazz quintet of the late 1950s, the Jazz Couriers, before going on to join a number of British jazz combos led by Dick Morrissey, Tony Crombie and Ronnie Scott in the late 1950s and early 1960s.  He later joined Cyril Davies and Alexis Korner to form the original line-up of Blues Incorporated.  Cecil subsequently collaborated with Robert Margouleff to form the duo TONTO's Expanding Head Band, a project based on a unique combination of synthesizers which led to them collaborating on and co-producing several of Stevie Wonder's Grammy-winning albums of the early 1970s. The TONTO synthesizer was described by Rolling Stone as "revolutionary".

Early life
Cecil was born in London on 9 January 1937. He became a radio ham by the age of nine. He worked as an engineer in the Royal Air Force during the time that he was learning to be a professional jazz musician. He became a member of Ronnie Scott's group during his 20s, before changing styles and becoming one of the founders of Blues Incorporated.

Cecil moved to South Africa before relocating to San Francisco in the mid-1960s. After a stint at the Los Angeles recording studio of Pat Boone, Cecil settled in New York City and began to modulate.

Career
With Robert Margouleff, Cecil formed the duo TONTO's Expanding Head Band, a synthesizer-based project. The duo were closely associated with Stevie Wonder's Talking Book (1972), sharing the Best Engineered Album, Non-Classical award as well as collaborating on and co-producing classic Wonder albums such as Music of My Mind, Innervisions and Fulfillingness' First Finale. Cecil is credited, with Margouleff, as engineer for the Stevie Wonder-produced album Perfect Angel (1974), by Minnie Riperton.

Cecil and Margouleff began constructing "The Original New Timbral Orchestra" (TONTO) in 1968. It became the largest analog synthesizer, as well as the most advanced one at the time. The massive synthesizer with Malcolms revolutionary newly designed joy stick modular and pioneering a way to make the multiple keyboards to play more than one key at a time and could talk to each other for the first time made revolutionizing the way Synthisizers could be played forever. TONTO's debut was the pair's first album Zero Time (1971). Their unique sound made them highly sought-after and they went on to collaborate with, amongst others, Quincy Jones, Bobby Womack, the Isley Brothers, Billy Preston, Gil Scott-Heron, Weather Report, Stephen Stills, the Doobie Brothers, Dave Mason, Little Feat, Joan Baez, and Steve Hillage. TONTO also appeared in Phantom of the Paradise (1974), although Cecil was reportedly incensed because he had not approved of its use in the film and only used it as a prop. .

The vocalist Gil Scott-Heron, who wrote that he considered Cecil a creative genius, along with keyboardist Brian Jackson enlisted Cecil and his TONTO synthesizer for the production of their collaborative album, 1980. Scott-Heron and Jackson were featured on the album cover with the synthesizer. TONTO was described as "revolutionary" by Rolling Stone, but it eventually fell behind more modern synthesizers that were simpler to utilize.

Later life
Cecil sold TONTO in 2013 to the National Music Centre in Calgary. Through John Leimseider, the museum finished a complete restoration of the synthesiser five years later, with Leimseider dying shortly afterwards. TONTO continued to be on display there at the time of Cecil's death.

Cecil died on 28 March 2021. He was 84 and suffered from an unspecified long illness prior to his death.

Malcolm was survived by his wife of 63 years, Poli Cecil, and their son, Milton "Moonpup" Cecil.

Honours and recognition
Cecil was nominated for and won a Grammy Award in 1973 for best engineered recording – non-classical.  This was in recognition for the work he did with Margouleff on Wonder's Innervisions. He and Robert Margouleff beat Pink Floyd's Dark Side of the Moon and Elton John's seminal Goodbye Yellow Brick Road. Malcolm and Margouleff were also nominated for best Engineer (non-Classical) in 1973 for Talking Book. Cecil was later bestowed the Unsung Hero award for lifetime achievement by Q magazine in 1997.

Discography

As leader/co-leader

Solo
1981 Radiance

With TONTO's Expanding Headband
1971: Zero Time
1974: It's About Time
1996: TONTO Rides Again (compilation of above)

As sideman
1961: It's Morrissey, Man! – Dick Morrissey Quartet
1961: The Tony Crombie Orchestra
1961: Let's Take Five – Emcee Five
1962: Bebop from the East Coast – Emcee Five
1971: Where Would I Be? – Jim Hall Trio
1973: 3+3 – The Isley Brothers
1974: Live It Up – The Isley Brothers
1975: The Heat Is On – The Isley Brothers
1976: Harvest for the World – The Isley Brothers
1978: Secrets – Gil Scott-Heron (with Brian Jackson)
1980: 1980 – Gil Scott-Heron (with Brian Jackson)
1980: Real Eyes – Gil Scott-Heron
1981: Reflections – Gil Scott-Heron
1982: Moving Target – Gil Scott-Heron
1983: Shut 'Um Down; Angel Dust (singles) – Gil Scott-Heron
1994: Spirits – Gil Scott-Heron
1996: A Jazzy Christmas – Bill Augustine
2009: A Jazzy Christmas 2 – Bill Augustine
2011: We're New Here – Gil Scott-Heron (with Jamie xx)

Production, programming, and/or engineering
As producer, programmer, and/or engineer:

With Stevie Wonder
1972: Music of My Mind
1972: Talking Book
1973: Innervisions
1974: Fulfillingness' First Finale
1991: Jungle Fever

Various
Dave Mason – It's Like You Never Left (1973)
Mandrill – Beast From The East (1975)
Billy Preston – It's My Pleasure (1975)
Billy Preston – Billy Preston (1976)
Steve Hillage – Motivation Radio (1977)

Savoy Brown – Kings of Boogie (1989 – recording engineer)

Neil Norman – Greatest Science Fiction Hits lV (1998)
Pete Bardens – Watercolours (2002)

References

External links
 
 
 Malcolm Cecil NAMM Oral History Interview (2016)
Malcolm Cecil obituary in New York Times (2021)

1937 births
2021 deaths
English record producers
English composers
British jazz bass guitarists
Musicians from London
Blues Incorporated members